Anthony Egan is a former Gaelic footballer and manager with the Mayo county football team. He played defence and midfield back. He got a shoulder injury in 1981. Egan was proposed to take up the mantle as Mayo manager in 2010, but was reportedly rejected as too old for the job.

References

Gaelic football managers
Mayo inter-county Gaelic footballers